Jumeirah Mosque is a mosque in Dubai, Emirate of Dubai, United Arab Emirates. Construction began in 1976; the mosque is built in traditional Fatimid style which originated from Syria and Egypt. Opened in 1979, the Jumeirah Mosque visit has been a key activity under the 'Open Doors. Open Minds.' programs of the Sheikh Mohammed Centre for Cultural Understanding (SMCCU). The Jumeirah Grand Mosque was a gift from the Late Sheikh Rashid bin Saeed Al Maktoum, the former Ruler of Dubai and father of the current Ruler of Dubai Sheikh Mohammed bin Rashid Al Maktoum. It is said that it is the most photographed mosque in all of Dubai. Organized tours are available for non-Muslims. It is open for all to visit whether you're a Muslim or not.

History of Jumeirah Mosque 
The Jumeirah mosque was built in the year 1979. It was built by the architect of Sheikh Rashid bin Saeed Al Maktoum. The mosque was a gift to the current ruler HH Sheikh Mohammed bin Rashid Al Maktoum. It is located near the region of the desert. It is one of the well known mosques in Dubai. Initially, when the mosque was being built, Jumeirah the location, wasn't a very deserted place. Dubai was starting to spread, it was starting to develop. During the period in which the mosque was being built there were Arab Fisherman and pear hunters who were living there. The mosque was built for the purpose of the fabricated sense of the city of Dubai and the residents and visitors presence within it. The mosque was rebuilt after destroyed in 1960.

Interior 
The interior architecture of the mosque has features of Islam. The mosque is an Islamic architectural mosque as there is certain things you see. The mosque has multiple columns as a support structure on the inside which is known as a hypostyle design which is seen commonly in many Islamic architectural mosques. There is a prayer hall and Qibla wall which is also part of the inside of the mosque. The Qibla wall is facing the direction of Mecca. The interior of the mosque is influenced by the architecture of the Fatimids empire dating back to the 9th century of Egypt. The inside of the mosque is designed or filled with colors of blue and yellow and other sorts. The mosque has a high dome top making the area of space wide. In the laws of the Koran, decorations in form of human or animal images are not allowed inside the mosque. Therefore, the walls are decorated by incredibly beautiful ornament and elegant Arabic letters. Floors are covered with a big one-piece carpet, which is embroidered with intricate floral patterns. The inside of the mosque is not followed by a specific culture it allows anyone do visit even you do not follow the religion that is of Islam.

Exterior 
The Exterior of the mosque has an elegant facade that is seen from the outside. The name of the mosque was inspired by the thousands of visitors that visited the mosque every month. The exterior of the mosque is built with pink sandstone and other pieces of marble. It was built with the use of multicolored marble stones and the Quran verses engraved with shaped stones The Jumeirah mosque has an engraved dome top with Arabic scriptures drawn in a pattern on the dome of the mosque. The exterior architectural design of the mosque also includes two minarets, ablution fountain. The intricate design on the domes are seen on the minarets and throughout the outside of the mosque. The mosque has two faces one of which is for the local residents whose main purpose is to come pray there. The other face of the mosque is on a busy road covered by palm trees which make it a perfect photographic spot for people.

Mosque Rituals and Traditions 
As per the guidelines of the mosque there is certain things that are allowed and some that are not. Women to be allowed inside and attend the prayer session or tour of the mosque have to wear a scarf around the head to cover all of their hair from showing, covering their shoulders. Men are supposed to wear long pants, covering any skin from showing. The Jumeirah mosque has this policy called "Open Minds. Open Doors" which offers non-Muslims to come visit the mosque. The policy strives to “remove barriers between people of different nationalities and raise awareness of the local culture, customs and religion of the United Arab Emirates”. Every Monday through Friday the mosque holds religious events and activities. Friday's are when prayer sessions are held.There are also tours given to people who want to learn about the culture, and view the mosque. The Jumeirah Mosque is open to everyone. During these tours everyone is allowed to ask questions about the place and learn. There is also a fountain at the front of mosque in which many people who visit will learn the purpose of. Volunteers will demonstrate how they use the fountain for cleansing before prayers and how it is a part of the culture of the mosque.

See also
 Grand Mosque (Dubai)
 Islam in the United Arab Emirates
 Sheikh Mohammed Centre for Cultural Understanding

References

External links 

Islam city mosques
 Jumeirah Mosque
Jumeirah Mosque Essay , Article , Images, Note
Jumeirah Mosque Dubai Official Website
The Sheikh Mohammed Centre for Cultural Understanding (SMCCU)

Mosques in Dubai
Architecture in Dubai
Mosque buildings with domes